Eilema dorsti is a moth of the subfamily Arctiinae. It was described by Hervé de Toulgoët in 1977. It is found in Ethiopia.

References

dorsti
Moths described in 1977